The Cathedral of the Holy Trinity is the cathedral of the Anglican Diocese of Quebec. It is home to two parishes:  the Parish of Quebec and la Paroisse de Tous les Saints. It stands on the western side of Quebec City's Place d'Armes.

When it was formed the Diocese of Quebec covered both Upper and Lower Canada.   Today, its territory covers 720,000 km2 in the central and eastern parts of the province of Quebec but does not include the area around Montreal. It has 7,817 Anglicans on the parish rolls in 93 congregations. The Cathedral of the Holy Trinity was designated a National Historic Site of Canada in 1989 and plaqued in 1993.  It has also been designated under provincial heritage legislation.

History

The Diocese of Quebec was founded in 1793. Its first bishop, Dr. Jacob Mountain, gave his early attention to the erection of a cathedral. The completed building, designed by military officers William Robe and William Hall, was built between 1800 and 1804. It was consecrated on August 28, 1804, becoming the first Anglican cathedral to be built outside of the British Isles.

Design
Designed in the neoclassic Palladian style, the cathedral was modeled after the St Martin-in-the-Fields Church in Trafalgar Square, London, and the Marylebone Chapel (now known as St Peter, Vere Street). King George III paid for the construction of the cathedral, and provided a folio Bible, communion silverware, and large prayer books to be used for worship.

The bell-tower is home to 8 bells, founded by Whitechapel in 1830, which are the oldest change-ringing peal in Canada. Due to deterioration, they were brought down in 2006, sent to Whitechapel in London for retuning, and reinstalled in April 2007.

Burials
Charles Lennox, 4th Duke of Richmond (1764–1819)

Gallery

References

External links

Cathedral of the Holy Trinity Official site
Diocese of Quebec
Corporation du patrimoine et du tourisme religieux de Québec

Churches in Quebec City
Anglican church buildings in Quebec
National Historic Sites in Quebec
Anglican cathedrals in Quebec
Churches completed in 1804
Palladian Revival architecture in Canada
19th-century Anglican church buildings in Canada
1804 in Lower Canada
Quebec Anglophone culture in Quebec City
History of Anglicanism
Heritage buildings of Quebec
Churches on the National Historic Sites of Canada register
Old Quebec